Berezkin may refer to:

People with the surname

 Aleksander Berezkin, Russian intersex man
 Dmitry Berezkin, Russian sailor
 Yevgeniy Berezkin, Belarusian footballer playing